Froschauer is a German-language surname.

People 
 Christoph Froschauer (ca. 1490–1564), printer in Zürich
 Froschauer Bibel, a Zwinglian bible printed in Zürich from 1525 by Christoph Froschauer
 Daniel Froschauer (born 1965), Austrian classical violinist, member of the board of directors of the Vienna Philharmonic (son of Hellmuth)
 Helmuth Froschauer (1933–2019), Austrian conductor, especially a choral conductor (father of Daniel)

Surnames